The 1940–41 international cricket season was from September 1940 to April 1941. There were no international tournaments held during this season due to initial impact of the Second World War.

Season overview

December

Ceylon in India

See also
 Cricket in World War II

References

International cricket competitions by season
1940 in cricket
1941 in cricket